The Archdiocese of San Luis Potosí is a Latin Church ecclesiastical jurisdiction or archdiocese of the Catholic Church in Mexico. A metropolitan see, its ecclesiastical province contains three suffragan dioceses: Ciudad Valles, Matehuala and Zacatecas. The cathedra is found within the Cathedral of St. Louis the King in the episcopal see of San Luis Potosí.

Bishops
Pedro Barajas y Moreno (1854–1868)
Manuel del Conde y Blanco (1869–1872)
José Nicanor Corona e Izarraraz (1873–1883)
Jose Maria Ignacio Montes de Oca y Obregón (1884–1921)
Miguel María de la Mora y Mora (1922–1930)
Guillermo Tritschler y Córdova (1931–1941), appointed Archbishop of Monterrey, Nuevo León
Gerardo Anaya y Diez de Bonilla (1941–1958)
Luis Cabrera Cruz (1958–1967)
Estanislao Alcaraz y Figueroa (1968–1972), appointed Archbishop of Morelia, Michoacán
Ezequiel Perea Sánchez (1972–1986)
Arturo Antonio Szymanski Ramírez (1987–1999)
Luis Morales Reyes (1999–2012) – Archbishop emeritus
Jesús Carlos Cabrero Romero (2012–2022) – Archbishop emeritus
Jorge Alberto Cavazos Arizpe (2022–present)

Other priests of this diocese who became bishops
José Luis Dibildox Martínez, appointed Bishop of Tarahumara, Chihuahua in 1993
Juan Manuel Mancilla Sánchez, appointed Auxiliary Bishop of Texcoco, México in 2001
Lucas Martínez Lara, appointed Bishop of Matehuala, San Luís Potosí in 2006
Andrés Vargas Peña, appointed Auxiliary Bishop of México, Federal District in 2010

See also
List of Roman Catholic archdioceses in México

References

External links and references

Roman Catholic dioceses in Mexico
Roman Catholic ecclesiastical provinces in Mexico
A
Religious organizations established in 1854
Roman Catholic dioceses and prelatures established in the 19th century
1854 establishments in Mexico